Bodum is a ghost town in section 16 of Isanti Township, in Isanti County, Minnesota.

History
Bodum had a post office from 1899 until 1903, as well as a store, a creamery, and an ice house.  Bodum was not on a railroad line or major road, and never developed beyond a farm community.  Today, the only trace of the town that remains is the old store that is currently being used as a house.

Notes

Ghost towns in Minnesota
Former populated places in Isanti County, Minnesota